Mazin Fayyadh Ajeel (born 2 April 1997 in Nasiriyah, Iraq) is an Iraqi footballer who played as a right winger for Al-Zawraa in Iraq Premier League.

International career
Following his impressive performances with Al Naft, scoring five goals during the 2015–16 Iraqi Elite League season. Mazin was called up to the Iraqi NT squad an On 24 July 2016 he made his first international cap with Iraq against Uzbekistan in a friendly match. He scored his first goal in a friendly match against Syria.

International goals 
Scores and results list Iraq's goal tally first.

Honours

Club
Al-Zawraa
Iraqi Super Cup: 2021

References

External links
 

1997 births
Living people
People from Nasiriyah
Association football wingers
Iraqi footballers
Iraq international footballers
Al-Naft SC players
Al-Shorta SC players